Lycée Alexandre Dumas is a senior high school/sixth-form college in Saint-Cloud, Hauts-de-Seine, France, in the Paris metropolitan area.

It was previously named Lycée Florent-Schmitt but in 1996 a musical philosophy teacher from the school discovered pamphlets dating from the 1930s in which the namesake, Florent Schmitt, denounced German Jews and Israelite (Jewish) influence on music. Afterward there had been multiple attempts to change the school's name.

It was renamed in honor of Alexandre Dumas in 2003.

Notable Alumni 
 Jean Jolivet (1925 - 2018), French philosopher and medievalist
 Yves Calvi (1959-), French journalist and television presenter
 Éric Naulleau (1961-), French literary critic, editor, essayist and columnist
 Marine Le Pen (1968-), French lawyer and politician
 Marion Maréchal (1989-), French politician
 Alexandre Mars (1974-), French entrepreneur, philanthropist and author
 Caroline Mécary (1963-), French lawyer
 Adrien Taquet (1977), French politician
 Isabelle Huppert (1953), French actress

References

External links
 Lycée Alexandre Dumas 

Lycées in Hauts-de-Seine